GEO-2000 is the United Nations Environment Programme (UNEP) Global Environment Outlook 2000.

The UNEP launched the Global Environment Outlook in 1995 to assess environmental issues and to have them published. The first report was published in 1997, while the second report, known as GEO-2000, was published in 1999.

As well as some of the more well-known issues the report identified new threats such as:
 nitrogen's harmful impact on ecosystems
 increased severity of natural disasters
 species invasion as a result of globalization
 increased environmental pressures caused by urbanization
 decline in the quality of governance in some countries
 new wars which impact on both the immediate environment and neighbouring states
 the impact of refugees on the natural environment

External links
UNEP - official GEO-2000 portal

United Nations Environment Programme
United Nations reports
1999 documents
1999 in international relations
1999 in the environment